Eugène Mougin (17 November 1852 – 28 December 1924) was a French competitor in the sport of archery.  Mougin competed in one event, winning the 50 metre Au Chapelet competition. He is now considered by the International Olympic Committee to have won a gold medal.  No scores are known from that competition. He was born in Paris and died in Clichy, Hauts-de-Seine.

See also
 Archery at the 1900 Summer Olympics

Notes
  - Prizes at the time were silver medals for first place and bronze medals for second, as well as usually including cash awards.  The current gold, silver, bronze medal system was initiated at the 1904 Summer Olympics.  The International Olympic Committee has retroactively assigned medals in the current system to top three placers at early Olympics.

References

External links

 

1852 births
1924 deaths
Archers at the 1900 Summer Olympics
French male archers
Olympic archers of France
Olympic gold medalists for France
Olympic medalists in archery
Medalists at the 1900 Summer Olympics
Sportspeople from Paris